P. Rajagopal may refer to:

 P. Rajagopal (businessman) (1947-2019), founder of Saravana Bhavan chain of restaurants
 P. Rajagopal (Ambur MLA), Indian politician and former Member of the Legislative Assembly of Tamil Nadu